St. Xavier's College, Tezpur, is a general degree college situated at Salbasti, Tezpur, in Sonitpur district, Assam. This college is affiliated with the Gauhati University. This college offers different bachelor's degree courses in arts.

References

External links
http://www.sxctezpur.in/index.html

Universities and colleges in Assam
Colleges affiliated to Gauhati University
Sonitpur district
Educational institutions in India with year of establishment missing